Below is a list of dishes found in Thai cuisine.

Individual dishes
Note: The Thai script column is linked to how it is pronounced when available.

Rice dishes

Noodle dishes

Miscellaneous

Shared dishes

Curries

Soups

Salads

Fried and stir-fried dishes

Deep-fried dishes

Grilled dishes

Steamed or blanched dishes

Stewed dishes

Dipping sauces and pastes

Miscellaneous

Savoury snacks and starters

Sweet snacks and desserts

Drinks

See also

 Thai cuisine
 List of Thai ingredients
 List of Thai restaurants
 Phuket cuisine

References

Further reading
 Bhumichitr, Vatcharin. The Essential Thai Cookbook, 192 pages, New York: Clarkson N. Potter Inc., 1994

External links

 
List of street food vendors in Thailand

Dishes
Lists of foods by nationality